{{nihongo foot|Joe Musashi|Kanji: 武蔵／武蔵 襄| Furigana: むさし　じょう|Rōmaji: ジョー・ムサシ|Hepburn: Musashi Jō}} is a player character and main protagonist in Sega's Shinobi series of video games, first introduced in 1987. This original Shinobi hero has achieved great popularity during the late 1980s and early 1990s, when it was used as one of Sega's mascot characters. During this time he was cast as the protagonist of the original arcade game as well the Mega Drive/Genesis sequels The Revenge of Shinobi and Shinobi III: Return of the Ninja Master, also starring in two Game Gear titles. The Mega Drive/Genesis game Shadow Dancer: The Secret of Shinobi also starred Joe Musashi in its overseas release, although the character was originally written to be his estranged son in the Japanese version. In more recent Shinobi titles, he appears as an unlockable character in the 2002's Shinobi and its follow-up Nightshade and in Shinobi 3D, which stars his father Jiro. Due to his cult following and widespread acclaim from critics, he has been lauded as one of the greatest video game ninjas of all time.

Appearances

Joe Musashi is the protagonist of Shinobi (1987), The Revenge of Shinobi (1989), The G.G. Shinobi (1991), The G.G. Shinobi II: The Silent Fury (1992), and Shinobi III: Return of the Ninja Master (1993), the second of which introduced his bride . Musashi also appears as an unlockable playable character in the 2002 version of Shinobi for the PlayStation 2, and its 2003 sequel Nightshade (Kunoichi in Japan), as well as 2011's Shinobi 3D for the Nintendo 3DS.  His primary weapons in most games are shuriken or kunai. He also has the sword , which he is able to charge for a powerful special attack, and knows various ninjitsu skill techniques and spells.

Outside of Shinobi video games, Joe Musashi is a playable character in the racing game Sonic & All-Stars Racing Transformed, where he rides a quad bike and is able to throw fireballs, and appeared in Sonic the Comic as the protagonist of the stories "The Dark Circle", "Fear Pavilion", "The Art of War", "Way of the Warrior" and "Power of the Elements". The Shinobi series BGM compilation was released by Wave Master in 2009 as Shinobi Music Collection – Legend of Joe Musashi.

The identity of the protagonist in Shadow Dancer: The Secret of Shinobi (released in 1990) differs between versions. In the Japanese version, players control , the estranged son of Joe Musashi born in 1977, who was raised in New York by a martial arts instructor named Dick C. Kato after being separated from his birth parents. This backstory was discarded in the overseas versions in favor of making Joe Musashi himself the protagonist and having Kato be one of his young students. The original 1989 Shadow Dancer arcade game simply starred a nameless ninja, although the various home conversions would give him differing identities as well: the manual for the home computer ports produced by U.S. Gold claim that he is Joe Musashi, while the Master System version names him Takashi in the packaging and manual and Fuma during the game's attract sequence. Other relatives of Joe Musashi include his grandson and namesake from The Cyber Shinobi and his father Jiro Musashi from Shinobi 3D.

Reception
The character was received and remembered so well that he has continued to be often featured in retrospective top lists even many years after he had last starred in any title. As such, he was included in many top ten lists of the best video games ninja characters, including being ranked as second by CrunchGear in 2008, as fifth by Unreality in 2009, as eight by ScrewAttack and second by PC World in 2010, as fifth by machinima.com's Steve and Larson and seventh by Cheat Code Central in 2011, Including him on their top ten list, Virgin Media called him "the quintessential video game ninja" of the early days of gaming. while according to the yet another top ten list by CraveOnline, "Joe Musashi is like the Jack Bauer of ninjas". He was also featured on by PLAY's 2011 list of top ten ninja characters for the PlayStation consoles, with a comment regretting his replacement for the 2002's Shinobi by "some berk called Hotsuma", and ranked as the fourth swiftest ninja by Complex in 2012.

In 2000, GameSpot's news editor Shahed Ahmed named Joe Musashi as his "unquestionably" favorite all-time video game character of any kind, adding that it was Musashi's "complex mix of subtle style and violent fury that was so appealing". In 2004, 1UP.com ranked Musashi as the number one video game ninja ever, adding: "Hotsuma who?". GameDaily ranked him as the second top Sega character in 2008, behind only Sega's flagship character Sonic the Hedgehog, and in 2009 also listed "the badass ninja" as the fifth best video game archetype, citing Musashi as its epitome. Similarly, including him on the 2004 list of "top ten forces of good", Retro Gamer opined that "ninjas are just plain cool, and Shinobi (aka Joe Musashi) is by far the most impressive member of this elite group of assassins". Complex included "Capcom vs. Sega" as sixth fighting game crossover they would like to see the most in 2012, imagining Joe Musashi clashing with Capcom's Strider Hiryu.

His popularity, however, has been declining due to SEGA not including him in any recent game since his last title, especially among the new generations of gamers. In 2008, when readers of IGN voted on which of the two ninjas would win in a Hero Showdown contest, Joe Musashi or Ryu Hayabusa of Tecmo's Ninja Gaiden and Dead or Alive'' series, Hayabusa won easily with 82% of the votes. In 2010, GameSpot featured Musashi in the article discussing forgotten gaming mascots, but nevertheless calling him "one of the greatest video game ninjas of all time".

See also
Ninja in popular culture

References

Action video game characters
Fictional Japanese people in video games
Fictional swordfighters in video games
Male characters in video games
Ninja characters in video games
Science fantasy video game characters
Sega protagonists
 
Video game characters introduced in 1987
Video game characters who use magic
Video game mascots